Justs Sirmais (born 6 February 1995), also known as simply Justs, is a Latvian singer and television presenter. He represented Latvia in the Eurovision Song Contest 2016 with the song "Heartbeat".

Life and career

Early life
Justs was born on 6 February 1995 in Ķekava. He attended Riga State Gymnasium No.1. He began his musical journey as a street musician in Riga.

2015–present: Eurovision Song Contest 2016
On 31 January 2016, Justs was announced as one of the 20 competing acts in the second season of Supernova, the show used to select Latvia's representative to the Eurovision Song Contest. He was competing with the song "Heartbeat", written by Latvia's 2015 entrant Aminata Savadogo. In the first heat on 7 February, Sirmais advanced to the semi-final after winning over 40% of the televote. He competed in the semi-final on 21 February and advanced to the final through televoting. On 28 February, he won the national final and then represented Latvia at the Eurovision Song Contest 2016 in Stockholm, Sweden. He made it through the semi-final and placed 15th in the final. Justs earned his country's sixth best placing ever. On 17 May 2016 he released the EP To Be Heard. On 23 May 2016 he released the single "Ko Tu Dari?".

In January 2018, it was announced that he would co-host Supernova 2018. In April 2018, Justs released his debut studio album, Here I Am.

In September 2018, Sirmais announced on Instagram that he would be studying Music Production at university in Bristol, United Kingdom.

In November 2020, Sirmais  participated in the first season of Balss Maskā as the cute "Sparrow" and placed 3rd.

He entered Supernova again in 2023 to attempt to represent Latvia with the song 'Stranger', but he was eliminated in the semi final.

Discography

Studio albums

Extended plays

Singles

References

1995 births
English-language singers from Latvia
Eurovision Song Contest entrants of 2016
Eurovision Song Contest entrants for Latvia
21st-century Latvian male singers
Latvian pop singers
Living people
Musicians from Riga
Riga State Gymnasium No.1 alumni
Television people from Riga